Neoraputia is a genus of flowering plants belonging to the family Rutaceae.

Its native range is Southern Tropical America.

Species:

Neoraputia alba 
Neoraputia calliantha 
Neoraputia magnifica 
Neoraputia micrantha 
Neoraputia paraensis 
Neoraputia trifoliata

References

Zanthoxyloideae
Zanthoxyloideae genera